Evanna Patricia Lynch (born 16 August 1991) is an Irish actress and activist. She is best known for portraying Luna Lovegood in the Harry Potter film series.

Born in County Louth, Ireland, Lynch made her film debut in Harry Potter and the Order of the Phoenix (2007), reprising her role in successive sequels to critical praise, concluding with Harry Potter and the Deathly Hallows – Part 2 (2011) and series parody A Very Potter Senior Year (2012). Lynch appeared in G.B.F. (2013), which premiered at the Tribeca Film Festival to positive reviews. She made her stage debut in Houdini as Bess Houdini, which toured the UK in 2013. Lynch starred in the indie drama My Name Is Emily, which premiered at the 2015 Galway Film Fleadh to critical acclaim. In 2017, Lynch starred in revival of Disco Pigs at the Trafalgar Theatre in London. In 2018, she competed and scored third place on season 27 of Dancing with the Stars. She went on to star in the British stage adaptation of The Omission of the Family Coleman at the Theatre Royal, Bath in 2019.

As an activist, Lynch advocates for veganism and animal rights. She has been involved with several non-profit organisations and launched both a vegan-themed podcast and the cruelty-free cosmetics brand Kinder Beauty Box.

Early life and education
Evanna Patricia Lynch was born on 16 August 1991 in Termonfeckin, County Louth, to Marguerite and Donal Lynch. She has two older sisters and a younger brother. Her maternal uncle is Declan Kiberd, a distinguished scholar of Irish literature who is a professor at the University of Notre Dame.

Lynch read the Harry Potter series for the first time at age eight and became a fan, reading and writing fan fiction about the series and sending letters to the author, J. K. Rowling. She was educated at Cartown National School in Termonfeckin until June 2004 and then moved to Our Lady's College in Drogheda, where her father was the deputy principal. In 2008, she studied speculative fiction and drama at the Centre for the Talented Youth of Ireland, a summer school for gifted teens, in Glasnevin. While on the Harry Potter film set, Lynch was tutored for at least three hours a day. In September 2010, she attended the Institute of Education to repeat her Leaving Certificate.

Lynch developed an eating disorder at age eleven. She was hospitalised several times for anorexia, and stated that the Harry Potter novels were the only thing that could "pull her attention" from her condition. During this time, she often wrote to Rowling, and stated that "books and her kindness really made me want to live again." During the release of the fifth book Order of the Phoenix in June 2003, Lynch was hospitalised and her family consulted with the book's publisher and the hospital; she was subsequently allowed to leave for an hour and collect a signed copy of the book.

Career

2006–2011: Beginnings and Harry Potter series
In January 2006, Lynch auditioned at a casting call in London for the role of Luna Lovegood in Harry Potter and the Order of the Phoenix, the fifth film in the series adapted from the books. After auditioning against 15,000 other girls, and a subsequent screen test with lead actor Daniel Radcliffe, she was cast at age 14. Producers were impressed with her affinity for the character; David Heyman said: "The others could play Luna; Evanna Lynch is Luna." Although uninvolved in the casting process, Rowling believed that Lynch was perfect for the role. She had never acted professionally before the Harry Potter series, her experience having been limited to school plays. While filming Harry Potter, Lynch also made and helped design a number of fashion accessories for her character.

Harry Potter and the Order of the Phoenix was Lynch's debut screen performance in 2007. The film was a box office hit and garnered favourable reviews. Critics praised the performances of the supporting cast; Lynch was often singled out for acclaim: The New York Times called her performance "spellbinding", and Jane Watkins of Country Life said she "[brought] an appealing sweetness to her character that's not so developed in the book". She also voiced the character in the film's tie-in video game. Lynch reprised her role in Harry Potter and the Half-Blood Prince (2009). The film was critically and commercially successful. Wesley Morris of The Boston Globe wrote that Lynch "combats the movie's occasional sluggishness with a hilarious sluggishness of her own", and Michael Dwyer of The Irish Times called her the best Irish actress of 2009 for her work on the film. Her performance earned her Scream Award and Young Artist Award nominations, and she returned in the film's tie-in video game.

Harry Potter and the Deathly Hallows – Part 1 was released in 2010 to positive reviews and box office success. The Boston Herald commented that Lynch "is still delightfully lunar," while Quickflix criticised the film, noting that "the delightful Evanna Lynch is brutally underutilized". She reprised her role in the film's tie-in video game. Lynch appeared in the role for the final time in Harry Potter and the Deathly Hallows – Part 2. The film opened to critical acclaim and went on to become the fifth highest-grossing film of all time. The Seattle Times wrote that Lynch "continues to be all-that-and-a-radish-earring as the ever-wafting Luna Lovegood," and Orlando Sentinel named her as "maybe" one of his "favorite players in the finale." She again reprised her role in the film's tie-in video game. In August 2012 at Leakycon in Chicago she joined the cast of StarKid to play Luna Lovegood in a script reading of the third Harry Potter parody musical, A Very Potter Senior Year (the other two being A Very Potter Musical and A Very Potter Sequel).

Harry Potter author J. K. Rowling gave a speech during the premiere of Deathly Hallows – Part 2 in London, where she stated that there were seven major cast members in the series, whom she referred to as "The Big Seven", and she named Lynch as one of the seven members, along with Daniel Radcliffe, Rupert Grint, Emma Watson, Tom Felton, Matthew Lewis and Bonnie Wright. Rowling has maintained that, of all the actors in the film series, Lynch had the most influence on how the respective character was subsequently written; in 2012, she told Charlie Rose that when writing the final books, "I saw her. [She] got in my head. I even heard her voice when I was writing Luna."

2012–present: Further films and stage performances
Lynch went on to guest star as Princess Alehna in the first season finale of the Sky1 television series Sinbad. She was cast in the 2013 indie crime drama film Monster Butler, based on the life of British serial killer and thief Archibald Hall. The film was cancelled due to funding issues. Lynch starred in indie teen comedy G.B.F., which screened at the Tribeca Film Festival in New York City in April 2013 and at the Frameline Film Festival in San Francisco on 30 June 2013. The film received positive reviews.

In May 2013, it was announced that Lynch was to star in the British stage production of Houdini, which toured the U.K from September to October 2013; Lynch portrayed Bess Houdini, the wife and assistant of magician Harry Houdini. Lynch appeared alongside Harry Potter co-stars James and Oliver Phelps in Danny and the Human Zoo, released on BBC One in August 2015.  Lynch starred as the titular character in the Irish independent drama My Name Is Emily, written and directed Simon Fitzmaurice. The film premiered at the 2015 Galway Film Fleadh and garnered favorable reviews; the Galway Advertiser referred to Lynch's attributed her performance to "a lightness and ethereal quality" while remaining a "commanding lead, showing ... pain with a subtlety beyond her years." Lynch was nominated for Best Actress at the Irish Film and Drama Awards for her performance.

From July to August 2017, Lynch starred in a revival of Enda Walsh's Disco Pigs at Trafalgar Theatre. It was later transferred to off-Broadway at the Irish Repertory Theatre and played from January to March 2018. In November 2017, it was reported that she would star in the independent drama Indigo Valley, directed by Jaclyn Bethany, but was forced to drop out of the project due to scheduling conflicts and was replaced with Rosie Day. Lynch appeared in a cameo role in Jason Mewes' directorial debut Madness in the Method (2019). On 12 September 2018, Lynch was announced as one of the celebrities to compete on season 27 of ABC's Dancing with the Stars. Her professional partner was Keo Motsepe. Motsepe and Lynch made it to the show's finale, finishing in third place.

In March 2019, it was announced she would appear in the British premiere of the Argentinian play The Omission of the Family Coleman, written by Claudio Tolcachir. It premiered at the Theatre Royal, Bath and ran from March to April 2019. In July 2019, Lynch stated that she will star in the vegan-themed short film entitled You Eat Other Animals? late that year. Lynch lent her voice to Nickelodeon productions Middle School Moguls in 2019 and Rise of the Teenage Mutant Ninja Turtles in 2020. Lynch narrated the story The Fountain of Fair Fortune from the audiobook adaptation of The Tales of Beedle the Bard, an in-universe book of Wizarding World children's stories written by Rowling. The audiobook released in March 2020, in aid of her charity, Lumos.

After co-hosting the BBC Sounds official companion podcast for Normal People in 2020, she went on to work with two of its stars, India Mullen (Peggy) and Éanna Hardwicke (Rob), on Personal Space, a radio play for RTÉ Radio 1 in 2021.

Lynch currently co-hosts a podcast called Just Beings with psychologist Dr. Melanie Joy.

In 2023, Lynch is slated to voice the titular character in the animated film Being Betty Flood. Lynch will also play Lucia Joyce in the film James and Lucia, reprising a role she previously performed in a short film and a rehearsed stage reading.

Other ventures

Charity work
Her charity work includes participation with the Multiple Sclerosis Society of Ireland, in which she launched their MS Readathon fundraiser in 2010. Lynch is also a member of the Board of Advisors for the non-profit organisation, the Harry Potter Alliance (HPA). With the HPA, she has supported same-sex marriage in Maine, taken part in a webcast fundraiser, written an article about body image and contributed to a fundraising book.

Lynch is an ambassador for J. K. Rowling's charity Lumos. In 2016, Lynch and her Harry Potter co-star and fellow Lumos ambassador, Bonnie Wright, travelled to Haiti to learn about why there are 30,000 children living in orphanages, and met children who had been rescued from terrible conditions and reunited with their families. Lynch stated about charity work for children and families, "Without families and without love, children can't be children. The most important thing as a child is to be with your family. And you have to do everything you can to keep that family unit in place".

Lynch contributed an essay to the 2018 book Feminists Don't Wear Pink and Other Lies, curated by Scarlett Curtis, whose royalties went to the United Nations charity Girl Up.

Activism and veganism
In a 2019 interview, Lynch said she "hated the blood [from raw meat]" as a child and, at age 11, she became a vegetarian. In 2015, she turned to veganism for ethical reasons. Lynch said that her activism is mostly done "in my free time as a way to give back and a way to right the world".

In 2015, Lynch was the first person to sign the petition against live export in the On Cow tour, an event organised by Compassion in World Farming which visited eight cities in the European Union. Since then, she has joined many animal rights demonstrations and campaigns. In May 2018, Evanna Lynch and a journalist travelled to Kerala, India to observe the treatment of the endangered Asian elephant. In August, she and actor Peter Egan joined the organisation Save the Asian Elephants to hand in a 200,000-name petition to the Department for Environment, Food and Rural Affairs, demanding to ban the advertisement in the United Kingdom of "unethical Asian elephant related holidays abroad", among other requests.

In 2017, Lynch narrated the short documentary iAnimal by Animal Equality, dealing with the dairy industry. The film received a nomination at the 2018 Raindance Film Festival. In June 2018, she narrated a short film by the Humane Society International against the dog and cat meat trade in Asia. In October 2019, Lynch was announced as a Lovie Award winner for her activism. The committee stated that she "raises the bar for others in a position of fame to use the Internet in the most creative and accessible ways possible, to introduce new ideas to people that can truly change our world for the better".

The ChickPeeps podcast
In November 2017, Lynch founded the podcast The ChickPeeps, co-hosted by Harry Potter and the Order of the Phoenix actor Robbie Jarvis, Surfers Against Sewage representative Momoko Hill, and Protego Foundation founder Tylor Starr. Its content is based on veganism and features discussions on diverse topics, often joined by prominent activists such as Ingrid Newkirk, Earthling Ed, and Victoria Moran, among many others. Evanna Lynch started The ChickPeeps with the intention of running "a bit more vulnerable and human [vegan podcast] that feels like you're hanging out with friends... where we have a laugh, maybe we learn some things, maybe we ask some questions".

Kinder Beauty Box
In November 2018, Lynch co-founded, along with American actress Daniella Monet, the vegan and cruelty-free make-up and beauty care box Kinder Beauty Box. The subscription box, which started its monthly delivery in January 2019, was intended to "put ethical brands in the spotlight" and "overcome confusing jargon" used by big brands that test on animals. Kinder Beauty Box was conceived after Lynch and Monet discussed the difficulty they had looking for vegan beauty products. The products are curated by them, shipped in sustainable packaging and a portion of the sales goes to animal rights and environmental causes and benefits for vegan rights.

Just Beings podcast
In August 2021, Lynch teamed up with award-winning psychologist and bestselling author, Dr. Melanie Joy, to launch a brand-new podcast called Just Beings. On the show, Lynch and Joy examine the common psychology that drives all harmful and unjust behaviors. Through conversations with changemakers, they explore how we can shift our thinking to create a more compassionate and just world for people, animals, and the planet — and improve our personal lives and relationships in the process.

Personal life
Lynch lives in London, United Kingdom. She lived in Los Angeles for five years. Lynch dated Harry Potter co-star and ChickPeeps co-host Robbie Jarvis for nine years.  In a 2014 interview, Lynch mentioned having a devout Catholic upbringing. "I stopped going to mass a few years ago, mainly because I disagree with the rules," she said. "I don't like anything that's about punishing yourself and making you feel bad about yourself, and growing up I felt bad about indulging myself or doing anything for fun".

Lynch has worked to promote healthy self-esteem and body image in young girls because of her previous experiences with the eating disorder anorexia nervosa. Lynch wrote an essay entitled "Why the Body Bind is My Nightmare" in which she describes her emotional struggle with her appearance and how she managed to overcome this through the use of allusions that pertain to the Harry Potter series.

In October 2021, Headline in the UK and Ballantine Books in the USA published Lynch's book The Opposite of Butterfly Hunting: The Tragedy and Glory of Growing Up – A Memoir. It details "her recovery from anorexia and how the conflict between the comfort of self-destruction and the liberation of creativity still rages inside of her".

Filmography

Film

Television

Shorts

Music video

Video games

Stage

Other roles

Awards and nominations

See also
 List of vegans

References

External links

 Official Website
 
 
 The ChickPeeps

1991 births
21st-century Irish actresses
Actresses from County Louth
Audiobook narrators
Irish animal rights activists
Irish child actresses
Irish expatriates in the United Kingdom
Irish expatriates in the United States
Irish film actresses
Irish stage actresses
Irish television actresses
Irish veganism activists
Irish video game actresses
Irish voice actresses
Living people
People educated at Our Lady's College, Greenhills
People educated at the Institute of Education (Dublin)